Khris Davis is an American film, stage and television actor. He is best known for his roles as Steel in the drama film Judas and the Black Messiah and Malik in Space Jam: A New Legacy.

Career
A 2009 cum laude graduate of Cheyney University who earned a degree in theatre arts, Davis had his breakthrough role when he appeared in the 2017 film Detroit.

On December 12, 2018, Davis was cast as Luke in the Joseph Cross-directed film Summer Night. On May 27, 2021, Davis was cast as George Foreman in George Tillman Jr.'s 2023 biopic Big George Foreman. In May 2022, Davis was cast as Biff Loman in Miranda Cromwell and Marianne Elliott's Broadway revival of Death of a Salesman along with Wendell Pierce, Sharon D. Clarke, and André De Shields.

Filmography

Theater 
 The Royale (2016) - Jay
 Sweat (2017) - Chris
 Fireflies (2018) - Charles
 Death of a Salesman (2022) - Biff Loman

Awards and nominations

Nominations
 2016 Drama League Awards - Distinguished Performance Award – The Royale

References

External links 
 
 
 
 Broadway World

American male film actors
American male television actors
21st-century African-American people
21st-century American male actors
African-American male actors
Year of birth missing (living people)
Place of birth missing (living people)
Living people